Indian Mathematical Society (IMS) is the oldest organization in India devoted to the promotion of study and research in mathematics. The Society was founded in April 1907 by V. Ramaswami Aiyar  with its headquarters at Pune. The Society started its activities under the tentatively proposed name Analytic Club and the name was  soon changed to Indian Mathematical Club. After the adoption of a new constitution in 1910, the society acquired its present name, namely, the Indian Mathematical Society. The first president of the Society  was B. Hanumantha Rao.

Publications

The Society publishes two periodicals both of which are quarterly:

The Journal of the Indian Mathematical Society (JIMS: ISSN 0019-5839) 
The Mathematics Student

The 1911 volume of the Journal contains one of the earliest contributions of the Indian mathematician Srinivasa Ramanujan. It was in the form of a set of questions. A fifteen page paper entitled Some properties of Bernoulli Numbers contributed by Srinivasa Ramanujan also appeared in the same 1911 volume of the Journal.

The Mathematics Student usually contains the texts of addresses, talks and lectures delivered at the Annual Conferences of the Society,  the abstracts of research papers presented at the Annual Conferences, and the Proceedings of the Society's Annual Conferences, as well as research papers, expository and popular articles, and book reviews.

Annual Conferences

The first Annual Conference of the Society  was held at Madras in 1916. The second conference was held at Bombay in 1919. From that time on, a conference was held every two years until 1951 when it was decided to hold the conferences annually. The twenty-fifth Conference  was held at Allahabad in 1959 which was inaugurated by Jawaharlal Nehru, the first Prime Minister of India.

Memorial Award Lectures

During every Annual Conference, the following Memorial Award Lectures are arranged as a part of the Academic Programme:

P.L. Bhatnagar Memorial Award Lecture (instituted in 1987).
Srinivasa Ramanujan Memorial Award Lecture (instituted in 1990).
V. Ramaswamy Aiyer Memorial Award Lecture (instituted in 1990).
Hansraj Gupta Memorial Award Lecture (instituted in 1990).
Ganesh Prasad Memorial Award Lecture (instituted in 1993 and delivered every alternate year).

IMS Prizes

Professor A. K. Agarwal Award

Award of INR 10,000 for the best publication in any journal in the world. The first  Professor A. K. Agarwal Award for best publication awarded to Dr. Neena Gupta.

P.L. Bhatnagar Memorial Prize

This Prize is awarded annually to the top scorer of the Indian team at the International Mathematical Olympiad. It consists of a cash of Rs. 1000/- and a Certificate. The award is presented during the Inaugural Session of the Annual Conference of the Indian Mathematical Society.

Prizes for research paper presentations

The Society holds, during its Annual Conferences, a Special Session of Paper Presentation Competition and Prizes are awarded to the best research paper in various areas. This Special Session is held as a part of the Academic Programme.

Six IMS Prizes for papers in the areas of algebra, geometry, topology, functional analysis, differential geometry, discrete mathematics, number theory, operations research, fluid dynamics, biomathematics and computer science.
AMU Prize for papers in the areas of algebra, functional analysis and differential geometry.
V.M. Shah Prize for papers in analysis.

Council of the Society

The Indian Mathematical Society  is governed by a Council. The Council includes nine office bearers of the Society.

Presidents of IMS

1907 – 1949

1949 – 1975

1975 – 2000

2000 – 2015

2015 – present

List of other mathematical societies in India

Allahabad Mathematical Society 
Bharata Ganita Parishd (formerly, Banars Mathematical Society)
Bihar Mathematical Society 
Calcutta Mathematical Society
Gujarat Mathematical Society 
Kerala Mathematical Association
Marathwada Mathematical Society  (founded in 1999)[www.marathwadamathsociety.org/]
Orissa Mathematical Society 
Punjab Mathematical Society 
Rajasthan Ganita Parishd 
Ramanujan Mathematical Society
Tripura Mathematical Society
Vijnana Parishad of India

See also
List of mathematical societies

References

External links

Mathematical societies
1907 establishments in India
Scientific organisations based in India